Dan Wallace (born 14 June 1942) is a former Irish Fianna Fáil politician who served for almost twenty five years as Teachta Dála (TD) for the Cork North-Central constituency.

A former Sacristan in Farranree Church and subsequent customs clerk with the Ford Motor Company in Cork, Wallace was an unsuccessful candidate at the 1981 and February 1982 general elections. He was first elected to the 24th Dáil at the November 1982 general election, having topped the poll, and was re-elected to Dáil Éireann in every subsequent general election until he retired at that 2007 general election.

In February 1992, he was appointed on the nomination of Taoiseach Albert Reynolds as Minister of State at the Department of the Environment, serving until January 1993. In July 1997, he was appointed on the nomination of Taoiseach Bertie Ahern as Minister of State at the Department of the Environment and Local Government, serving until June 2002.

In the 29th Dáil, Wallace was Vice-Chairman of the Foreign Affairs Committee until November 2004.

Wallace was Lord Mayor of Cork from 1985 to 1986.

References

1942 births
Living people
Fianna Fáil TDs
Members of the 24th Dáil
Members of the 25th Dáil
Members of the 26th Dáil
Members of the 27th Dáil
Members of the 28th Dáil
Members of the 29th Dáil
Local councillors in Cork (city)
Lord Mayors of Cork
Ministers of State of the 28th Dáil
Ministers of State of the 26th Dáil